Hòn Đất is a township and capital of Hòn Đất District, Kiên Giang Province, Vietnam.

References

Populated places in Kiên Giang province
District capitals in Vietnam
Townships in Vietnam